The Fabulous Show with Fay and Fluffy is a Canadian children's television show, which premiered in 2022 on Family Jr.. Hosted by drag entertainers Fay Slift and Fluffy Soufflé, the show features stories and songs to entertain and educate children.

The series was created by Rennata and Georgina Lopez of Lopii Productions.

The series received four Canadian Screen Award nominations at the 11th Canadian Screen Awards in 2023, for Best Pre-School Program or Series, Best Photography in a Lifestyle or Reality Program or Series (Alysha Galbreath for the episode "I Love Where I Come From"), and Best Writing for a Pre-School Program or Series (2: Victoria Gallant for  "I Love Being Different", and Tyra Sweet for "I Love My Family").

References

External links

2020s Canadian children's television series
2020s Canadian LGBT-related television series
2022 Canadian television series debuts
Family Jr. original programming
Drag (clothing) television shows